Brenda Chamberlain may refer to:
 Brenda Chamberlain (politician)
 Brenda Chamberlain (artist)